Aidong Zhang  is a computer scientist whose research topics include machine learning and bioinformatics. She is William Wulf Faculty Fellow and Professor of Computer Science at the University of Virginia, where she also holds affiliations with the Department of Biomedical Engineering and School of Data Science.

Education and career
Zhang earned her PhD in 1994 at Purdue University. She joined the department of computer science of the University at Buffalo as an assistant professor in 1994, became full professor in 2002, and was named University at Buffalo Distinguished Professor in 2012 and SUNY Distinguished Professor in 2014. She chaired the department from 2009 to 2015. After taking a leave from the department from 2015 to 2018 to serve as a program director for the National Science Foundation, she moved to the University of Virginia in 2019. She continues to be listed by the University at Buffalo as professor emerita.

Zhang was the founding chair of the ACM Special Interest Group on Bioinformatics, Computational Biology, and Biomedical Informatics, and served as its chair from 2011 to 2015. She has been the editor-in-chief of IEEE/ACM Transactions on Computational Biology and Bioinformatics since 2017.

Books
Zhang is the author of books including Advanced Analysis of Gene Expression Microarray Data (World Scientific, 2006) and Protein Interaction Networks: Computational Analysis (Cambridge University Press, 2009).

Recognition
Zhang was elected as an IEEE Fellow in 2009 "for contributions to multimedia data indexing". She was named an ACM Fellow in 2017, "for her contributions to bioinformatics and data mining".

References

External links

Living people
American computer scientists
American women computer scientists
Purdue University alumni
University at Buffalo faculty
University of Virginia faculty
Fellow Members of the IEEE
Fellows of the Association for Computing Machinery
American women academics
Year of birth missing (living people)
20th-century women scientists
21st-century women scientists
21st-century American women